A Banjo Pier is a pier in the shape of a banjo.

The most notable example is probably the Banjo Pier in Looe, Cornwall, England  as it was the first and thus the prototype for many others around the world. It was designed by Joseph Thomas and built by Daniel Taylor.

References

Piers
Piers in Cornwall
Looe